In phonetics, vowel reduction is any of various changes in the acoustic quality of vowels as a result of changes in stress, sonority, duration, loudness, articulation, or position in the word (e.g. for the Creek language), and which are perceived as "weakening". It most often makes the vowels shorter as well.

Vowels which have undergone vowel reduction may be called reduced or weak. In contrast, an unreduced vowel may be described as full or strong.

Transcription

There are several ways to distinguish full and reduced vowels in transcription. Some English dictionaries mark full vowels for secondary stress, so that e.g.  is a full unstressed vowel while  is a reduced, unstressed schwi.

Weakening of vowel articulation

Phonetic reduction most often involves a mid-centralization of the vowel, that is, a reduction in the amount of movement of the tongue in pronouncing the vowel, as with the characteristic change of many unstressed vowels at the ends of English words to something approaching schwa. A well-researched type of reduction is that of the neutralization of acoustic distinctions in unstressed vowels, which occurs in many languages. The most common reduced vowel is schwa.

That is, the jaw, which to a large extent controls vowel height, tends to be relaxed when pronouncing reduced vowels. The primary distinction in words like folio is again one of backness. However, the backness distinction is not as great as that of full vowels; reduced vowels are also centralized, and are sometimes referred to by that term. They may also be called obscure, as there is no one-to-one correspondence between full and reduced vowels.

Sound duration is a common factor in reduction: In fast speech, vowels are reduced due to physical limitations of the articulatory organs, e.g., the tongue cannot move to a prototypical position fast or completely enough to produce a full-quality vowel (compare with clipping). Different languages have different types of vowel reduction, and this is one of the difficulties in language acquisition (see e.g. Non-native pronunciations of English and Anglophone pronunciation of foreign languages). Vowel reduction of second language speakers is a separate study.

Stress-related vowel reduction is a principal factor in the development of Indo-European ablaut, as well as other changes reconstructed by historical linguistics.

Vowel reduction is one of the sources of distinction between a spoken language and its written counterpart. Vernacular and formal speech often have different levels of vowel reduction, and so the term "vowel reduction" is also applied to differences in a language variety with respect to, e.g., the language standard.

Some languages, such as Finnish, Hindi, and classical Spanish, are claimed to lack vowel reduction. Such languages are often called syllable-timed languages. At the other end of the spectrum, Mexican Spanish is characterized by the reduction or loss of the unstressed vowels, mainly when they are in contact with the sound . It can be the case that the words pesos, pesas, and peces are pronounced the same: .

Vowel inventory reduction
In some cases phonetic vowel reduction may contribute to phonemic (phonological) reduction, which means merger of phonemes, induced by indistinguishable pronunciation. This sense of vowel reduction may occur by means other than vowel centralisation, however.

Many Germanic languages, in their early stages, reduced the number of vowels that could occur in unstressed syllables, without (or before) clearly showing centralisation. In early Old High German and Old Saxon, this had been reduced to five vowels (i, e, a, o, u, some with length distinction), later reduced further to just three short vowels (i/e, a, o/u). In Old Norse, likewise, only three vowels were written in unstressed syllables: a, i and u (their exact phonetic quality is unknown). Old English, meanwhile, distinguished only e, a, and u (again the exact phonetic quality is unknown).

Specific languages

English

Stress is a prominent feature of the English language, both at the level of the word (lexical stress) and at the level of the phrase or sentence (prosodic stress). Absence of stress on a syllable, or on a word in some cases, is frequently associated in English with vowel reduction – many such syllables are pronounced with a centralized vowel (schwa) or with certain other vowels that are described as being "reduced" (or sometimes with a syllabic consonant as the syllable nucleus rather than a vowel). Various phonological analyses exist for these phenomena.

Latin

Old Latin had initial stress, and short vowels in non-initial syllables were frequently reduced. Long vowels were usually not reduced.

Vowels reduced in different ways depending on the phonological environment. Before  and some consonant clusters, they became .

 , * > Old Latin ,  "make, affect"
 , * > ,  "made, affected" (participles)
 , * > Old Latin ,  "I jump, I jump on"
  > Latin ,  "I give birth, I gave birth"

In Classical Latin, stress changed position and so in some cases, reduced vowels became stressed. Stress moved to the penult if it was heavy or to the antepenult otherwise.
Classical Latin , 
 , 
 ,

Romance languages
Vulgar Latin had seven vowels in stressed syllables. In unstressed syllables,  merged into  and  merged into , yielding five possible vowels. Some Romance languages, like Italian, maintain this system, while others have made adjustments to the number of vowels permitted in stressed syllables, the number of vowels permitted in unstressed syllables, or both. Some Romance languages, like Spanish, French and Romanian, lack vowel reduction altogether.

Italian
Standard Italian has seven stressed vowels and five unstressed vowels, as in Vulgar Latin. Some regional varieties of the language, influenced by local vernaculars, do not distinguish open and closed e and o even in stressed syllables.

Neapolitan
Neapolitan has seven stressed vowels and only four unstressed vowels, with e and o merging into . At the end of a word, unstressed a also merges with e and o, reducing the number of vowels permitted in this position to three.

Sicilian
Sicilian has five stressed vowels and three unstressed vowels, with  merging into  and  merging into . Unlike Neapolitan, Catalan or Portuguese, Sicilian incorporates this vowel reduction into its orthography.

Catalan
Catalan has seven or eight vowels in stressed syllables and three, four or five vowels in unstressed syllables, depending on dialect. The Valencian dialect has five, as in Vulgar Latin.

Portuguese
Portuguese has seven or eight vowels in stressed syllables. For instance some speakers pronounce the first syllable of dezembro ("December") differently from the first syllable of dezoito ("eighteen"), with the latter being more reduced. The verb pregar ("to nail") is distinct from pregar ("to preach"), and the latter verb was historically spelled prègar to reflect that its unstressed  is not reduced.

Portuguese phonology is further complicated by its variety of dialects, particularly the differences between European Portuguese and Brazilian Portuguese, as well as the differences between the respective dialects of the two varieties.

Slavic languages

Bulgarian
In the Bulgarian language the vowels а [a],  ъ [ɤ], о [ɔ] and е [ɛ] can be partially or fully reduced, depending on the dialect, when unstressed to [ɐ], [ɐ], [o] and [ɪ], respectively. The most prevalent is [a] > [ɐ], [ɤ] > [ɐ] and [ɔ] > [o], which, in its partial form, is considered correct in literary speech. The  reduction [ɛ] > [ɪ] is prevalent in the eastern dialects of the language and is not considered formally correct.

Russian

There are six vowel phonemes in Standard Russian. Vowels tend to merge when they are unstressed. The vowels  and  have the same unstressed allophones for a number of dialects and reduce to a schwa.

Other types of reduction are phonetic, such as that of the high vowels ( and ), which become near-close; этап ('stage') is pronounced , and мужчина ('man') is pronounced .

Early Slavic languages

Proto-Slavic had two short high vowels known as yers: a short high front vowel, denoted as ĭ or ь, and a short back vowel, denoted as ŭ or ъ. Both vowels underwent reduction and were eventually deleted in certain positions in a word in the early Slavic languages, beginning from the late dialects of Proto-Slavic. The process is known as Havlík's law.

Irish
In general, short vowels in Irish are all reduced to schwa in unstressed syllables, but there are some exceptions. In Munster Irish, if the third syllable of a word is stressed and the preceding two syllables are short, the first of the two unstressed syllables is not reduced to schwa; instead it receives a secondary stress, e.g. ('scythe-man'). ('art'),   ('gather'). In Ulster Irish, long vowels in unstressed syllables are shortened but are not reduced to schwa, e.g. ('girl'),   ('gallon').

See also
Clipping (phonetics)
Elision
Silent letter
Schwa
Unstressed vowel

Notes

References

Bibliography

 
 

Phonetics
Stress (linguistics)
Phonology